= Town power station (Ljubljana) =

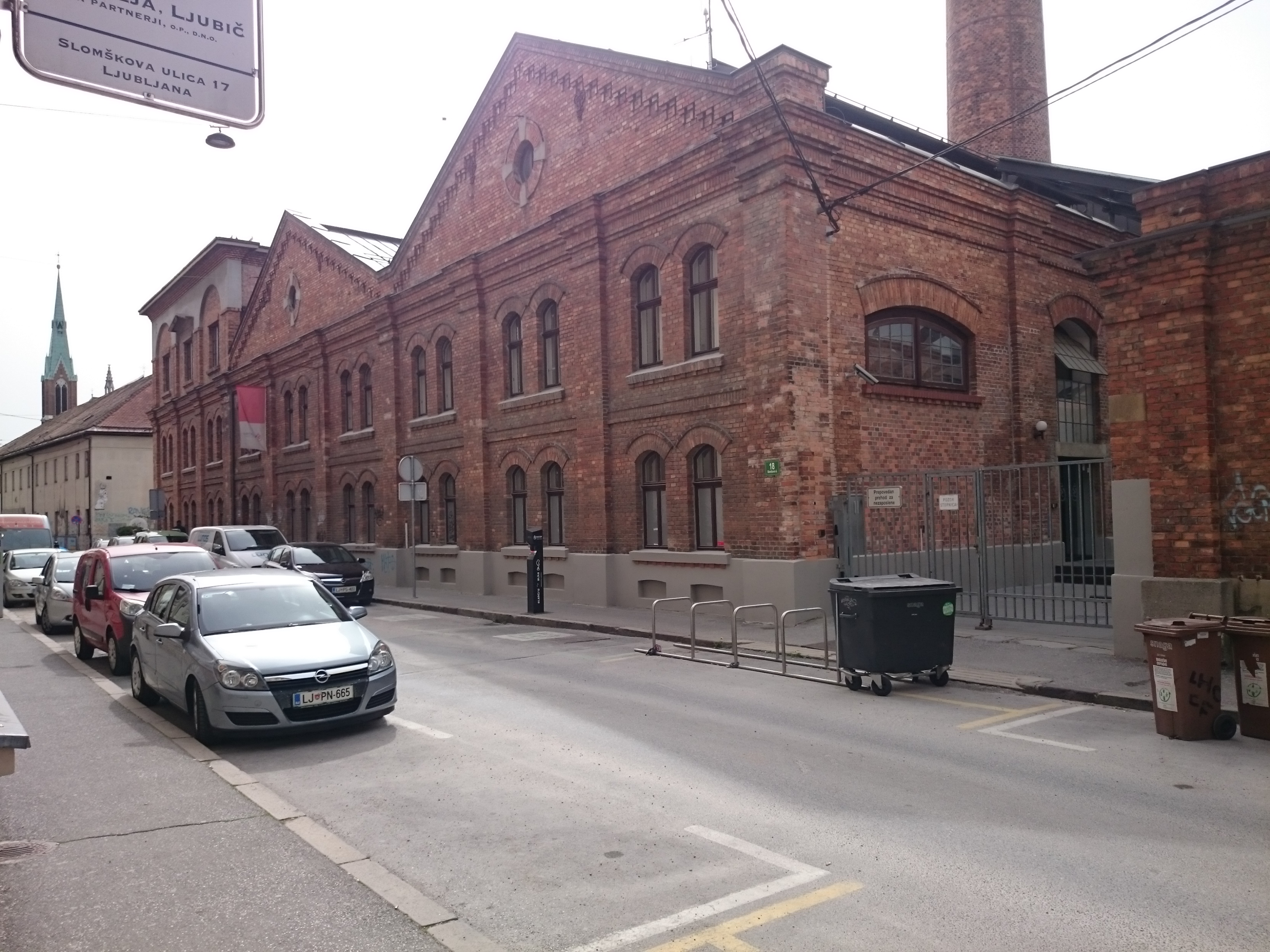
stara mestna elektrarna

The Town power station (1 January 1898 in Slovenia's capital Ljubljana) is a building that originally functioned as a town power station. Over the years, the building changed many times, including its architecture and purpose. One alteration was to build a theatre hall inside.

== History ==
The area included several buildings. The main building was inaugurated on 1 January 1898 as Ljubljana's power plant. Shortly after opening, the plant struggled as the electricity generated was expensive. The high cost was due to poor calculations and the price of coal imports. Everything changed in 1901 once the tram service became a large daily user of electricity.

The power station stood during the World Wars and worked until the 1960s. Other power stations were built, and electricity production moved to them. The old building was gradually abandoned. Until the fall of the Iron Curtain, the complex of buildings was not used.

== Stara mestna elektrarna ==
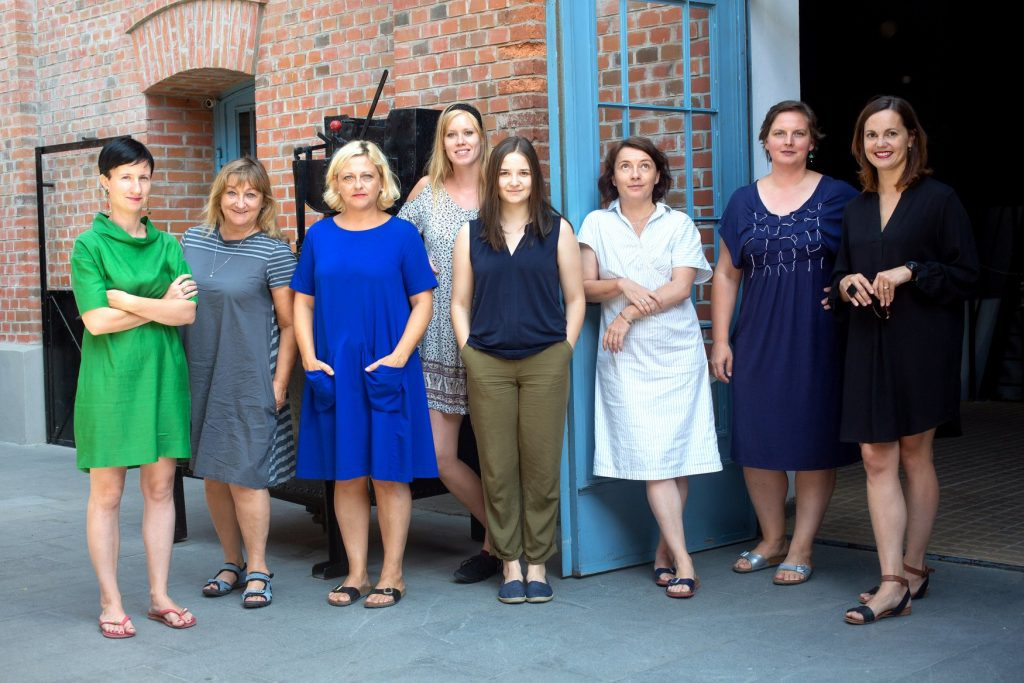
Bunker - organisation of artist activities

Change came in the mid-1980s and 1990s, when young alternative artists such as Ema Kugler and theatre directors Matjaž Berger(1997 Rotacija kozmosa 100, Ob stoletnici Mestne elektrarne ljubljanske) and Enrique Vargas within the framework of the Exodus festival. They started a new life called (in Slovenian) Stara elektrarna.

After the 1980s the building was called old power station. Keeping the historical exterior, the building housed technology and cultural organizations. In the twentieth century the theatre hall opened.

Electric company Elektro Ljubljana opened a museum of electricity and supported theatrical activities. The artistic field is supported by institute Bunker. They hosted artistic festivals including Mladi levi , Exponto, Exodos and Mesto žensk.
